Marilyn Martinez (February 9, 1955 – November 3, 2007) was an American stand up comedian and actress. She was a regular performer at The Comedy Store in Hollywood.

Martinez was of Mexican descent. She appeared in numerous television comedy specials including 1st Amendment Stand Up; Hot Tamales Live: Spicy, Hot and Hilarious; and The Latin Divas of Comedy. Her acting credits included My Wife and Kids and the film Pauly Shore Is Dead.

According to her website, Martinez died on Saturday, November 3, 2007 at 10:16 am. She had been diagnosed with colon cancer almost nine months before.

References

External links

1955 births
2007 deaths
American film actresses
American stand-up comedians
American television actresses
Hispanic and Latino American actresses
Deaths from colorectal cancer
People from Los Angeles County, California
Deaths from cancer in California
American women comedians
Comedians from California
20th-century American comedians
21st-century American comedians
20th-century American actresses
21st-century American actresses